Kseniia Alexeyevna Levchenko (born March 29, 1996) is a Russian basketball player for Dynamo Kursk and the Russian national team. She participated at the EuroBasket Women 2017.

References

1996 births
Living people
Russian women's basketball players
People from Tynda
Point guards
Sportspeople from Amur Oblast